Maa Kasam is a 1985 Indian Hindi-language action drama film directed by Shibu Mitra, starring Mithun Chakraborty, Amjad Khan, Divya Rana, Ranjeet, Sharat Saxena and Pran in lead roles.

Plot 
Balwant returns home after completing his jail term. He discovers that the Thakur has a treasure map hidden in a diamond ring. He kills the Thakur, but fails to obtain the ring. He wanted to find the ring, but ends up killing his own wife. His dying wife takes her young son, Dharma, and requests the Thakurain to look after him as her own son. Balwant is again arrested and gets a long jail term. Now Dharma has grown as a hard-working and honest man under Thakurain's care. Now Chakradhari, a con man makes life miserable for the people. At the same time, Balwant completes his sentence and returns for the ring. Who possesses the ring forms the climax.

Cast 
Mithun Chakraborty as Dharma
Divya Rana as Santho
Ranjeet as Balwant
Pran as Inspector Kishanlal
Amjad Khan as Chakradhari
Sushma Seth as Thakurain
Sharat Saxena as Makhan Singh
Ram Mohan as Manager
Manik Irani as Kalu
Viju Khote as Constable B.A. Talwar
Sunder as Bhola Ram, Tribal Leader
Birbal as Lala
Guddi Maruti as Bhola Ram's daughter
Brahmachari as Dinu
Harish Patel
Huma Khan as Dancer in yellow sari
Punnu as Jaggu
Kalpana Iyer as an item number
Kim as an item number

Soundtrack 
Record Label: Super T-Series
Music: Bappi Lahiri
Lyrics: Faroukh Qaiser and Anjaan

Songs:
1. "Jabse Tujhko Dekha Hai" – S. Janaki, Manhar Udhas
2. "Ek Do Teen Aare Aare" – Amit Kumar, Manhar Udhas
3. "Rajaji Raja Rajaji" – Uttara Kelkar
4. "Pesh Karta Hoon" – Shabbir Kumar, Shobha Gurtu
5. "Bingo Bingo Bingo Mein Hoon" – Mohammad Aziz, Parvati Khan, Vijay Benedict

Awards:

Won- Filmfare Best Comedian Award for Amjad Khan

References

External links 
 

1985 films
1980s Hindi-language films
Indian action films
Films scored by Bappi Lahiri
Films directed by Shibu Mitra
1985 action films